Phyllonorycter delitella is a moth of the family Gracillariidae. It is found from southern Germany to Spain, Corsica, Sardinia, Italy and Greece and from France to Romania.

The larvae feed on Quercus pubescens. They mine the leaves of their host plant. They create a small, lower-surface, tentiform mine, with one strong fold in the lower epidermis. The upperside of the mine is mostly entirely eaten out. The pupa is located in the mine in a silken cocoon, that is attached to the mine at its upper and lower side. The frass is deposited along the sides of the cocoon.

References

delitella
Moths described in 1843
Moths of Europe